Kadu Kuttai is a small place in Vellalur, Coimbatore. Its name means "desert pond".

It is said that there is a huge amount of gold buried here (" 7 Kopparai of gold; Kopparai is an iron vessel which holds around 100 liters of sugarcane juice and used for boiling the juice to get sugar).

It was told that forest angles were safeguarding because there are gold diamonds and platinum. If anybody enters there they will be cursed and die.

Coimbatore district